N26 is a German bank.

N26 may also refer to:
 N26 (Long Island bus)
 BMW N26, an automobile engine
 Escadrille N26, a unit of the French Air Force
 London Buses route N26
 N26 road (Ireland)
 Route nationale 26, in France

See also
 26N (disambiguation)